Cabinet (or CAB) is an archive-file format for Microsoft Windows that supports lossless data compression and embedded digital certificates used for maintaining archive integrity. Cabinet files have .cab filename extensions and are recognized by their first four bytes (also called their magic number) MSCF. Cabinet files were known originally as Diamond files.

Design 

A CAB archive can contain up to 65,535 folders (distinct to standard operating system directories), each of which can contain up to 65,535 files for a maximum of 4,294,836,225. Internally, each folder is treated as a single compressed block, which provides more efficient compression than individually compressing each file.

Every entry in a folder has to be a file. Due to this structure, it is not possible to store empty folders in CAB archives.

The following shows an example a CAB file structure, demonstrating the relationship between folders and files:

 CAB file
 First folder
 
 
 Second folder
 
 

How paths should be handled is not specified in the CAB file format, leaving it to the software implementation:

 Some affix file paths to filenames only, as if all files in a CAB archive are in a single folder. IExpress works this way, as does Microsoft Windows Explorer, which can open CAB archives as a folder.
 , only since version 6 (which is included from Windows Vista to above) can extract files to their paths. The previous versions don't do it.

The CAB file format may employ the following compression algorithms:

 DEFLATE: invented by Phil Katz, the author of the ZIP file format (specifically, the MSZIP encapsulation)
 Quantum compression: licensed from David Stafford, the author of the Quantum archiver (not available in all versions of makecab.exe/diamond.exe)
 LZX: invented by Jonathan Forbes and Tomi Poutanen, given to Microsoft when Forbes joined the company
 NULL: stored

A CAB archive can reserve empty spaces in the archive as well as for each file in the archive, for some application-specific uses like digital signatures or arbitrary data.

Implementations 

Microsoft Windows supports creating CAB archive files using the makecab command-line utility. It supports extracting the contents of a CAB archive files using File Explorer, Setup API, and using the command-line commands expand.exe, extract.exe and extrac32.exe.

Other well-known software with CAB archive support includes WinZip, WinRAR or 7-Zip. The aforementioned cabextract is a common tool for Linux systems, but is only capable of extracting archives. The gcab tool however can both extract and create CAB archives. For a full list, see .

Uses 

A variety of Microsoft installation technologies use the CAB format: these include Windows Installer, Setup API, Device Installer, Theme Pack and AdvPack (used by Internet Explorer to install ActiveX components). CAB files are also often associated with self-extracting programs like IExpress where the executable program extracts the associated CAB file. CAB files are also sometimes embedded into other files. For example, MSI and MSU files usually include one or more embedded CAB files.

Windows uses the cabinet format to archive its Component-Based Servicing (CBS) log, which is kept in the folder . Deletion of the files without following a specific procedure can cause the deleted files to be regenerated at an increased pace.

On Linux systems, CAB archives are used by fwupd to distribute firmware updates from hardware vendors that can be flashed on non-volatile memory.

Related formats 

The .cab filename extension is also used by other installer programs (e.g. InstallShield) for their own proprietary archiving formats. InstallShield uses zlib for compression (see Deflate), but their headers are not the same as for Microsoft CAB files so they are incompatible and cannot be manipulated or edited with the programs that are made for standard cabinet format. Specialized third-party utilities, such as Unshield, can extract this specific proprietary format.

Windows CE installer uses a variant of Microsoft CAB format with a  magic. The compression is typically NONE, but MSZIP can also be found.

Microsoft Publisher has a "Pack and Go" feature that bundles a publisher document, together with all external links, into a CAB file with a .PUZ extension. These files are meant to be activated with a companion .EXE file which is distributed along with the .PUZ file. These files may be opened with any CAB file extraction program.

See also 

 List of archive formats

References

External links 

 Microsoft Cabinet SDK – updated versions of these resources are available in the Microsoft Windows SDK
 Cabinet Software Development Kit (CAB SDK) – downloads of all Microsoft CAB SDK versions (free)

Archive formats
Windows administration